Thomas Edward Nagle   (October 30, 1865 – March 9, 1946), was a Major League Baseball player who played catcher for the Chicago Colts of the National League. He appeared in 46 games for the Colts from 1890 to 1891. He played in the minor leagues on and off between 1886 and 1895.

External links

1865 births
1946 deaths
Major League Baseball catchers
Chicago Colts players
19th-century baseball players
Eau Claire Lumbermen players
LaCrosse Freezers players
Omaha Omahogs players
Omaha Lambs players
Indianapolis Hoosiers (minor league) players
Baseball players from Milwaukee